The 2001 UNCAF Interclub Cup served as qualification to the 2002 CONCACAF Champions' Cup; it also defined C.S.D. Municipal as the Central American champion of the season. The final round was played at San José, Costa Rica.

First round
Top two places advance to the Final Round

Group A

 Comunicaciones qualifies for the Final Round ahead of Tauro F.C. based on head-to-head results.

Group B

Final round

 Municipal, Saprissa, and Olimpia qualified to the 2002 CONCACAF Champions' Cup.

UNCAF Interclub Cup
1
2001–02 in Honduran football
2001–02 in Guatemalan football
2001–02 in Costa Rican football
2001–02 in Panamanian football